Veli-Pekka Kokkonen (born 19 July 1966 in Kerava) is a retired Finnish high jumper. He became Finnish champion in 1988. His personal best jump was 2.23 metres (7' 3"), achieved in June 1992 in Tuusula.

References

1966 births
Finnish male high jumpers
Living people
People from Kerava
Sportspeople from Uusimaa
20th-century Finnish people